Incisura auriformis is a species of sea snail, a marine gastropod mollusk in the family Scissurellidae.

Description

Distribution
This marine species occurs off Australia.

References

 Wilson, B. (1993). Australian Marine Shells. Prosobranch Gastropods. Kallaroo, WA : Odyssey Publishing. Vol.1 1st Edn
 Geiger D.L. & Jansen P. (2004). New species of Australian Scissurellidae (Mollusca: Gastropoda: Vetigastropoda) with remarks on Australian and Indo-Malayan species. Zootaxa 714:1–72.
 Geiger D.L. (2012) Monograph of the little slit shells. Volume 1. Introduction, Scissurellidae. pp. 1–728. Volume 2. Anatomidae, Larocheidae, Depressizonidae, Sutilizonidae, Temnocinclidae. pp. 729–1291. Santa Barbara Museum of Natural History Monographs Number 7

Scissurellidae
Gastropods described in 2004